The Turtle Beak mansion (觜宿, pinyin: Zī Xiù) is one of the twenty-eight mansions of the Chinese constellations. It is one of the western mansions of the White Tiger.

Asterisms

References 

Chinese constellations